Jamhuri High School, formerly known as Government Indian School and later The Duke of Gloucester School, is one of the oldest schools in Kenya.  It was founded as a Railway Educational Centre in 1906.  Prior to Kenya's independence from the British, the school, located at Ngara Nairobi, predominantly enrolled students from the Indian community in Nairobi, hence its former name Government Indian School.

History and operations
In 1955, the school's name was changed to The Duke of Gloucester School, named after Prince Henry, Duke of Gloucester. After Kenya's independence in 1964 the school was renamed Jamhuri High School. Jamhuri, the Swahili word for Republic, symbolized independence and Kenya's sovereignty as a republic. Since then the school has had a diversified enrolment of students of African, Indian, and White heritage.

The school is popularly known as "Jamuu" and its nickname is "Dukes".

Jamhuri High School has a robust alumni association available on their website

Notable alumni

 Urjit Patel - The 24 Governor for the Reserve bank of India
 Justice Abdul Majid Cockar – former Chief Justice of Kenya
 Samuel Salim Lone – Kenyan journalist; former Director of the News and Media Division, Department of Public Information, of the United Nations
 Bali Mauladad – big-game hunter
 Alfred Mutua – politician who is the governor of Machakos County
 Vimal Shah – chief executive officer, Bidco Africa

See also

 Education in Kenya
 List of schools in Kenya

References
  

1900s establishments in Kenya
1906 establishments in Africa
1906 establishments in the British Empire
Educational institutions established in 1906
Schools in Nairobi